The 1939–40 Gauliga was the seventh season of the Gauliga, the first tier of the football league system in Germany from 1933 to 1945. It was the first season held during the Second World War.

The league operated in eighteen regional divisions with the league containing 216 clubs all up, 41 more than the previous season. The majority of Gauligas were regionally sub-divided during the season, with finals or final rounds played to determine the champions. The  league champions entered the 1940 German football championship, won by FC Schalke 04 who defeated Dresdner SC 1–0 in the final. It was Schalke's fifth national championship, with the club winning six championships all up during the Gauliga era.

The 1939–40 season saw the sixth edition of the Tschammerpokal, now the DFB-Pokal. The 1940 edition was won by Dresdner SC, defeating 1. FC Nürnberg 2–1 on 1 December 1940.

The number of Gauligas, eighteen, remained unchanged compare to the previous season which had seen the addition of the Gauliga Ostmark and Gauliga Sudetenland to the original sixteen.

In the part of Czechoslovakia incorporated into Germany in March 1939, the Protectorate of Bohemia and Moravia, a separate Czech league continued to exist which was not part of the Gauliga system or the German championship. In Poland the German invasion in September 1939 caused the Polish league to stop play near the end of the 1939 season and, unlike in Bohemia and Moravia, the league would not resume till after the war. Eventually, in 1941, the Gauliga Wartheland, covering the Reichsgau Wartheland, and the Gauliga Generalgouvernement, covering the General Government, were created in the areas annexed by Nazi Germany and in occupied Poland put these leagues were only for ethnic German clubs and not open to Polish teams.

Champions

The 1939–40 Gauliga champions qualified for the group stage of the German championship. SK Rapid Wien, SV Waldhof Mannheim, Dresdner SC and FC Schalke 04 won their championship groups and advanced to the semi-finals with the latter two reaching the championship final which Schalke won.

FC Schalke 04 won their seventh consecutive Gauliga title, Fortuna Düsseldorf won their fifth consecutive one, Vorwärts-Rasensport Gleiwitz their third consecutive title while Stuttgarter Kickers, Dresdner SC, CSC 03 Kassel and VfL Osnabrück defended their 1938–39 Gauliga title.

German championship

References

Sources
 kicker-Almanach 1990  Yearbook of German football, publisher: kicker Sportmagazin, published: 1989, 
 100 Jahre Süddeutscher Fußball-Verband  100 Years of the Southern German Football Federation, publisher: SFV, published: 1997
 Die deutschen Gauligen 1933–45 – Heft 1–3  Tables of the Gauligas 1933–45, publisher: DSFS

External links
 Das Deutsche Fussball Archiv  Historic German league tables

1939-40
1
Ger